Yasmin Mogahed (born March 11, 1980) is an American educator and motivational speaker. She is a specialist in spirituality, psychology, and personal development. Mogahed is the first female instructor at the AlMaghrib Institute.

Education and career
Mogahed completed a BSc degree in psychology at the University of Wisconsin–Madison, where she also earned an MS degree in journalism and mass communications.

She is the first Muslim woman to become an instructor at AlMaghrib Institute. Previously, she had been a writing instructor at Cardinal Stritch University. She is internationally known for her motivational lectures.

Works
Mogahed has written columns for Huffington Post and was an Islam section staff columnist for InFocus News.

Books
 Reclaim Your Heart Yasmin Mogahed, LLC 
 Love & Happiness: A collection of personal reflections and quotes Yasmin Mogahed, LLC 
 Healing the Emptiness: A Guide to emotional and spiritual well-being Yasmin Mogahed

References

External links 
 Official Website
 Audios by Yasmin Mogahed

University of Wisconsin–Madison College of Letters and Science alumni
American Muslims
American women writers
Living people
1980 births
21st-century American women
Egyptian emigrants to the United States